Steele Creek may refer to:

 Steele Creek, Alaska, a census-designated place near Fairbanks, Alaska
 Steeles Creek, Kentucky
 Steele Creek (Mohawk River tributary), a tributary of the Mohawk River in New York
 Steele Creek (Charlotte neighborhood), a neighborhood of Charlotte, North Carolina
 Steele Creek Presbyterian Church and Cemetery, a historic site in the neighborhood
 Steele Creek (Hardin County, Tennessee), a stream
 Steele Creek Roadhouse, a historic site in Alaska
 Steele Creek Trail, a trail in Melbourne, Australia

See also
 Steel Creek (disambiguation)